Gerardo Bonilla is a San Juan, Puerto Rico-born professional race car driver.  He competed in and won the IMSA Lites Championship (now Cooper Tires Prototype Lites) in 2007, the Star Mazda Championship in 2006, and the Skip Barber National Championship in 2005.  He also works as an instructor for the Lucas Oil School of Racing.

In 2007 and 2008 he competed for B-K Motorsports as part of the factory Mazda entry in the American Le Mans Series LMP2 class alongside co-driver Ben Devlin. In 2009 he competed for Gotham Competition in the 24 Hours of Daytona, but does not have a full-time ride in any series. In 2010 he will serve as the full-time driver coach for the U.S. F2000 National Championship.

References

External links 
Official website of Gerardo Bonilla

1975 births
24 Hours of Daytona drivers
American Le Mans Series drivers
Formula BMW USA drivers
Rolex Sports Car Series drivers
Living people
People from DeLand, Florida
Sportspeople from Knoxville, Tennessee
Sportspeople from San Juan, Puerto Rico
Puerto Rican racing drivers
Racing drivers from Miami
Sportspeople from Orlando, Florida
Indy Pro 2000 Championship drivers